Before German reunification, West Germany (including West Berlin) used country code +49 and East Germany used country code +37, each with its separate area codes and telephone networks. Calls between the two countries required international dialling, 0037 to call East Germany from West Germany, and 0649 from East Germany to West Germany. For incoming international calls, the second digit of the "canonical" area code (0 or 9) had to be omitted - e.g. while Leipzig's national prefix was 0941, its international prefix was +3741; Dresden's 0051 was +3751.

On 1 June 1992, all area codes were brought under the +49 code. This had been introduced on 15 April, with the old and new codes running in parallel. East Berlin's 002 area code had already been brought under the 030 (the former West Berlin) area code. All area codes (except Berlin's) had the second digit (0 or 9) into the "canonical" code replaced by 3 (e.g. Erfurt's former 0061 (globally +37-61) area code became 0-361 or globally +49-361). In places, the code was changed entirely.

The +37x prefix was then freed up to be used by many of the newly independent states which were created following the collapse of the Soviet Union, which had previously used that country's +7 code (e.g. Lithuania adopted the code +370). Some European microstates which had previously used the networks of the countries surrounding them also took on +37x codes, for example, Monaco adopted +377, replacing the code +33, which it had shared with France.

Canonical numbers and local shortcuts
The East German telephone network did not only consist of a strictly hierarchic star topology, but had additional links connecting (usually neighbor) areas directly (similar to the UK). Thus each area had one "canonical" prefix (00x... or 09x..., with x denoting the district, e.g. 005... for Saxony) involving the central offices and a number of shortcut prefixes 02... through 05... bypassing those and reducing toll charges.

E.g. Zwickau had the canonical prefix 0074 (+37-74), but had different "shortcut" prefixes" from other areas, valid only in those - e.g. 036 from East Berlin.
These "shortcuts" were not ported to the West German numbering plan.

Berlin
Because both parts of the divided Germany did not consider anywhere in Berlin as being part of a "foreign country", both parts of the city had special prefixes for each other: West Berliners could call East Berliners (from East German 002-... or +37-2-...) with the prefix 0372 (just like another city/area, instead of 00-37-2).  Similarly East Berliners could call West Berliners using the prefix 8-49, as if they were calling a local number.

See also
Telephone numbers in Germany

References

Communications in East Germany
Telephone numbers in Germany